Godzilla Game was a board game released by Mattel in 1978. Between two and four people could play. Each player controlled six spaceships. One player's spaceships were all green, another's were all yellow, another's were all orange, and another's were all magenta. Occasionally Godzilla would appear and eat one of the spaceships. The last player to have a spaceship left would be the winner.

References

 

Board games introduced in 1978
Mattel games
Licensed board games
Science fiction board games
Godzilla games